The parallel operator (also known as reduced sum, parallel sum or parallel addition)  (pronounced "parallel", following the parallel lines notation from geometry) is a mathematical function which is used as a shorthand in electrical engineering, but is also used in kinetics, fluid mechanics and financial mathematics. The name parallel comes from the use of the operator computing the combined resistance of resistors in parallel.

Overview
The parallel operator represents the reciprocal value of a sum of reciprocal values (sometimes also referred to as the "reciprocal formula" or "harmonic sum") and is defined by:

The operator gives half of the harmonic mean of two numbers a and b.

As a special case, for any number :

Further, for all distinct numbers 

The concept has been extended from a scalar operation to matrices and further generalized.

Notation
The operator was originally introduced as reduced sum by Sundaram Seshu in 1956, studied as operator ∗ by Kent E. Erickson in 1959, and popularized by Richard James Duffin and William Niles Anderson, Jr. as parallel addition or parallel sum operator : in mathematics and network theory since 1966. While some authors continue to use this symbol up to the present, for example, Sujit Kumar Mitra used ∙ as a symbol in 1970. In applied electronics, a ∥ sign became more common as the operator's symbol around 1974. This was often written as doubled vertical line available in most character sets (sometimes italicized as //), but now can be represented using Unicode character U+2225 ( ∥ ) for "parallel to". In LaTeX and related markup languages, the macros \| and \parallel are often used (and rarely \smallparallel is used) to denote the operator's symbol.

Properties 

and 

This implies immediately that  is a field where the parallel operator takes the place of the addition, and that is field is isomorphic to 

The following properties may be obtained by translating through  the corresponding properties of the complex numbers.

Field properties 

As for any field,  satisfies a variety of basic identities.

It is commutative under parallel and multiplication:

It is associative under parallel and multiplication:

Both operations have an identity element; for parallel the identity is  while for multiplication the identity is :

Every element  of  has an inverse under parallel, equal to  the additive inverse under addition. (But  has no inverse under parallel.)

The identity element  is its own inverse, 

Every element  of  has a multiplicative inverse 

Multiplication is distributive over parallel:

Repeated parallel 

Repeated parallel is equivalent to division,

Unlike for repeated addition, this does not commute:

Binomial expansion 

Using the distributive property twice, the product of two parallel binomials can be expanded as

The square of a binomial is

The cube of a binomial is

In general, the th power of a binomial can be expanded using binomial coefficients which are the reciprocal of those under addition, resulting in an analog of the binomial formula:

Logarithm and exponential 

The following identities hold:

Parallel Functions 
A parallel function is one which commutes with the parallel operation:

For example,  is a parallel function, because

Factoring parallel polynomials 

for some roots  (possibly repeated) in  

Analogous to polynomials under addition, the polynomial equation

Quadratic formula 
A linear equation can be easily solved via the parallel inverse:

To solve a parallel quadratic equation, complete the square to obtain an analog of the quadratic formula

Including zero 

The extended complex numbers including zero,  is no longer a field under parallel and multiplication, because  has no inverse under parallel. (This is analogous to the way  is not a field because  has no additive inverse.)

For every non-zero ,

The quantity  can either be left undefined (see indeterminate form) or defined to equal .

Precedence 
In the absence of parentheses, the parallel operator is defined as taking precedence over addition or subtraction, similar to multiplication.

Applications
Here are some of the applications of the parallel operator

Circuit Analysis 
In electrical engineering, the parallel operator can be used to calculate the total impedance of various serial and parallel electrical circuits.

For instance, the total resistance of resistors connected in parallel is the reciprocal of the sum of the reciprocals of the individual resistors.

Likewise for the total capacitance of serial capacitors.

Lens Equation 
In geometric optics the thin lens approximation to the lens maker's equation.

There is a duality between the usual (series) sum and the parallel sum.

Examples
Question:
What is their resulting resistance?

Answer:
 
 The effectively resulting resistance is ca. 57 kΩ.

Question:
 A construction worker raises a wall in 5 hours. Another worker would need 7 hours for the same work. How long does it take to build the wall if both worker work in parallel?

Answer:
 
 They will finish in close to 3 hours.

Implementation

Suggested already by Kent E. Erickson as a subroutine in digital computers in 1959, the parallel operator is implemented as a keyboard operator on the Reverse Polish Notation (RPN) scientific calculators WP 34S since 2008 as well as on the WP 34C and WP 43S since 2015, allowing to solve even cascaded problems with few keystrokes like .

Projective view
The parallel operator may be understood with a homography on the projective line over a ring. The reciprocation operation is usually singular on null vectors, but with projective geometry the reciprocal is completed with "points at infinity". In fact, the translations from finite points are complemented by "translations at infinity" as valid projectivities.

Homogeneous coordinates are used  in algebraic geometry. As long as z is a unit,
 Consider this translation at infinity:

In the standard embedding b → [b : 1] which the translation at infinity takes to [1 : 1/a + 1/b] when b is a unit. Suppose now [c : 1] = [1 : 1/a + 1/b] for a unit c, so [c : 1] = [1 : 1/c]. Then
[1 : 1/c] = [1 : 1/a + 1/b]. The alternate embedding z → [1 : z] is used, in reverse, to obtain 1/c = 1/a + 1/b from the translation at infinity.

Notes

References

Further reading
 
  (10 pages)
 
  (33 pages)
 
   (19 pages)
 
 
  (37 pages) (NB. Unusual usage of ∥ for both values and units.)

External links
 https://github.com/microsoftarchive/edx-platform-1/blob/master/common/lib/calc/calc/calc.py

Abstract algebra
Elementary algebra
Multiplication